Tatiana Yurevna Perebiynis (born 15 December 1982) is a former professional tennis player from Ukraine. 

She reached the Wimbledon junior girls' singles final in 2000, and won the Wimbledon juniors doubles final that same year. 

In 2008, she reached her career-high ranking of world No. 55.

Biography
Tatiana Perebiynis was coached by her husband, Dimitriy "Dima" Zadorozhniy. They married on 15 October 2005 in Kharkiv. Her father, Yuriy Perebiynis, is retired and her mother, Alla Lihova, is an economist at a bank.

Tennis career
She lists winning the Wimbledon junior doubles in 2000 and reaching the final in singles that same year as memorable experiences.

Although Perebiynis has not won a WTA Tour singles title but she has a runner-up in single when she lost to Australian Alicia Molik in Stockholm in 2004. She did, however, win six WTA tournaments in doubles. Her most notable doubles titles are her two victories at the J&S Cup in Warsaw, partnering with Barbora Strýcová (2005) and Vera Dushevina (2007).

Her best performance at a Grand Slam tournament came at Wimbledon in 2005, when she partnered with Australia's Paul Hanley in mixed doubles. The pair reached the final, losing in straight sets to Mahesh Bhupathi and Mary Pierce.

The following year, she partnered with fellow Ukrainian Yuliana Fedak for the qualifying event of women's doubles at Wimbledon. The pair qualified for the event, then reached the semi-finals where they lost to Paola Suárez and Virginia Ruano Pascual.

While Perebiynis was a talented junior and a respected doubles player, she has had less success in singles on the main tour. Though she swiftly climbed up the ranks early in her career, reaching the third round at both Roland Garros and Wimbledon in 2004, her tennis career faltered when she was diagnosed with a viral infection in mid-2005. She was forced out of competition for over six months and, as a result, her ranking dropped to outside of the top 200. In October 2007, Perebiynis re-entered the top 100 after qualifying for the Kremlin Cup, jumping over 30 places to 97 in the rankings.

Grand Slam finals

Mixed doubles: 1 (0–1)

WTA career finals

Singles: 1 (0–1)

Doubles: 11 (6–5)

ITF finals

Singles: 9 (4–5)

Doubles: 7 (4–3)

Singles performance timeline

1Doha became a Tier I event in 2008. San Diego and Zurich are no longer Tier I events.

Top 10 wins

External links

 
 
 

1982 births
Living people
Sportspeople from Kharkiv
Ukrainian female tennis players
Olympic tennis players of Ukraine
Tennis players at the 2004 Summer Olympics
Tennis players at the 2008 Summer Olympics
Wimbledon junior champions
Grand Slam (tennis) champions in girls' doubles